The Casa Santa Museum is a public attraction at Jardin de Miramar, located in Antipolo, east of Metro Manila in The Philippines. The museum features Casa Santa Houses, which contain collections of Santa Claus figurines. It is one of the most extensive private collections of Santa Claus items in the world, with more than 3,700 figures.

History
The Casa Santa Museum started out as a small personal collection until it grew to a size where it needed a house where the Santa figurines could "live." The Casa Santa was then converted from a family rest house into a museum of Santa Claus collection in 1995. The house was remodelled by folk architect Rosario Encarnacion Tan, and the lighting design inside the museum was crafted by international Japanese light designer Shoko Matsumoto.

In December 2004, it was the cover of Starweek'''s Christmas and in Christmas 2008 appeared in the front page of the Philippine Inquirer. It has appeared in over 50 TV and movie productions -- Rated K, Wish Ko Lang, Unang Hirit, Magandang Umagang Bayan, US Girls, Boy and Kris''. On international television, it was covered by two news agencies, Reuters and Associated Press.

In addition to the collection, is a room full of miniature Christmas villages. A starter collection in the loft was displayed in 2010. After acquiring a significant number of mini-houses this year, it was given a room of its own. The village was designed by Bamboo Tonogbanua of Bacolod, who is a Christmas village collector.

In 2015, a newly renovated Santa's village was created by Christmas village miniature artist Bamboo Tonogbanua, an Ilonggo artist. The Casa Santa Playroom was designed to house small and big Santa stuffed toys collection.

References

External links 
 Antipolo Travel Guide information
 Official website

Sculpture gardens, trails and parks in Asia
Museums in the Philippines
Museums established in 1995
1995 establishments in the Philippines
Buildings and structures in Antipolo
Santa Claus
Tourist attractions in Rizal
Christmas art